The 1982–83 Football League season was Birmingham City Football Club's 80th in the Football League and their 48th in the First Division. After five wins and a draw from the last six league games, and needing to win their last game, away at Southampton, to ensure safety, they finished in 17th position in the 22-team division. They entered the 1982–83 FA Cup in the third round proper and lost to Crystal Palace in the fourth, and were eliminated by Burnley in the fourth round of the League Cup.

Thirty players appeared in at least one first-team game, and Noel Blake made most appearances, with 44 of the possible 49. There were 19 different goalscorers; Mick Ferguson was the club's leading scorer with eight goals, all scored in the league.

Football League First Division

League table (part)

FA Cup

League Cup

Appearances and goals

Numbers in parentheses denote appearances as substitute.
Players with name struck through and marked  left the club during the playing season.
Players with names in italics and marked * were on loan from another club for the whole of their season with Birmingham.

See also
Birmingham City F.C. seasons

References
General
 
 
 Source for match dates, league positions and results: 
 Source for lineups, appearances, goalscorers and attendances: Matthews (2010), Complete Record, pp. 400–01.

Specific

Birmingham City F.C. seasons
Birmingham City